The Hawaii Independent is an online newspaper, founded in 2008 by Ikaika Hussey, Travis Quezon (formerly of the Honolulu Weekly), and an editorial board which includes Beverly Keever, Pete Britos, Jamie Winpenny, Jade Eckardt, Samson Reiny and others. Hussey served as publisher, Quezon was the managing editor, and Winpenny, Eckardt and Reiny were all editors, reporting on different sides of the island of Oahu. The paper focuses on hyperlocal news and investigative journalism, with individual pages for ahupuaa (neighborhoods) throughout Oahu and the major Hawaiian Islands.

American news websites
Newspapers published in Hawaii
Newspapers established in 2008